Chester by-election may refer to several elections in Chester, England:

 1869 Chester by-election, following the elevation to the peerage of Hugh Grosvenor
 1916 Chester by-election, following the resignation of Robert Yerburgh
 1940 City of Chester by-election, following the death of Sir Charles Cayzer
 1956 City of Chester by-election, following the appointment of Basil Nield as Recorder of Manchester 
 2022 City of Chester by-election, following the resignation of Chris Matheson